Manaktala or Maniktala is an Indian (Khatri) surname. Notable people with the surname include:

Sanjay Manaktala (fl. 2010–present), American-born Indian stand-up comedian
Tanya Maniktala (born 1997), Indian actress
Vikas Manaktala (born 1981), Indian actor

Surnames of Indian origin
Indian surnames
Punjabi-language surnames
Hindu surnames
Khatri clans
Khatri surnames